Sergey Vitaliyevich Chernetskiy (born 9 April 1990 in Sertolovo) is a Russian cyclist, who currently rides for UCI ProTeam . In August 2019, he was named in the startlist for the 2019 Vuelta a España.

Major results

2010
 1st  Team pursuit, UEC European Under-23 Road Championships
 8th Overall Troféu Joaquim Agostinho
 8th Klasika Primavera
2011
 UEC European Under-23 Road Championships
1st  Team pursuit
2nd  Individual pursuit
 4th Klasika Primavera
 5th Overall Troféu Joaquim Agostinho
 10th Piccolo Giro di Lombardia
2012
 2nd Time trial, National Under-23 Road Championships
 2nd Overall Ronde de l'Isard
1st Stage 2
 2nd Overall Giro della Valle d'Aosta
1st Stage 6 (ITT)
 2nd Gran Premio Città di Camaiore
 2nd Chrono Champenois
 4th Overall Rhône-Alpes Isère Tour
1st Young rider classification
 4th Overall Tour de l'Avenir
 4th Duo Normand (with Anton Vorobyev)
 9th Time trial, UCI Under-23 Road World Championships
2013
 1st  Overall Tour des Fjords
1st  Points classification
1st  Young rider classification
1st Stages 1 & 3 (TTT)
 1st Stage 1b (TTT) Settimana Internazionale di Coppi e Bartali
 4th Overall Tour of Austria
 7th Overall Vuelta a Burgos
 10th Roma Maxima
2014
 2nd Time trial, National Road Championships
 2nd Tour of Almaty
 3rd GP Miguel Induráin
 5th Overall Tour of Beijing
 7th Milano–Torino
 8th Trofeo Platja de Muro
 9th Grand Prix of Aargau Canton
2015
 1st Stage 6 Volta a Catalunya
 7th Overall Volta ao Algarve
2016
 1st  Time trial, National Road Championships
 4th Overall Tour of Belgium
 5th GP Miguel Induráin
 7th Overall Tour La Provence
 10th Overall Tour de Suisse
 10th Grand Prix of Aargau Canton
2017
 8th Overall Vuelta a Burgos
 10th Giro di Lombardia
2018
 1st  Overall Arctic Race of Norway
 3rd Overall Tour of Guangxi
 8th Overall Tour Poitou-Charentes en Nouvelle-Aquitaine
2019
 5th Prueba Villafranca de Ordizia
 10th Overall Vuelta a Murcia
2020
 7th Overall Tour of Saudi Arabia
 8th Overall Tour du Limousin
2021
 4th Overall Sibiu Cycling Tour
 7th Giro della Toscana

Grand Tour general classification results timeline

References

External links

1990 births
Living people
Russian male cyclists
Cyclists at the 2016 Summer Olympics
Olympic cyclists of Russia
People from Vsevolozhsky District
European Games competitors for Russia
Cyclists at the 2015 European Games
Sportspeople from Leningrad Oblast
21st-century Russian people